American Liberty University (ALU) was founded in 1999 in Orange County, California By Dr. Hamid Kevin Soltani.

Accreditation 

ALU is approved by the California Bureau for Private Postsecondary Education (BPPE; not an accrediting agency) since 2004. Previously, it was accredited by the BPPVE, which restructured in 2009-2010 as the BPPE.

ALU is also accredited in the United Kingdom by the Accrediting Council for Independent Colleges and Schools (ACICS), a national accrediting agency recognized by the US Council for Higher Education Accreditation (CHEA) and the United States Department of Education.

ALU runs courses in Business Administration (BBA, MBA, Ph.D.) and Oriental Medicine (Ph.D.), Diploma in Acupunctures, CE programs for Dentists, Chiropractors, Acupuncture and Oriental Medicine specialists.

References

Universities and colleges in Orange County, California
Educational institutions established in 1999
1999 establishments in California
Private universities and colleges in California